Alexeyevo is a rural locality (a village) in Biryakovskoye Rural Settlement, Sokolsky District, Vologda Oblast, Russia. The population was 13 as of 2002.

Geography 
Alexeyevo is located 107 km northeast of Sokol (the district's administrative centre) by road. Prokshino is the nearest rural locality.

References 

Rural localities in Sokolsky District, Vologda Oblast